Nadia Ahmed Abdou is the current governor of Baheira Governorate, Egypt and she is the first female governor in Egypt. She was born in Alexandria, Egypt.

References

21st-century Egyptian women politicians
21st-century Egyptian politicians
Year of birth missing (living people)
Living people
Politicians from Alexandria